The Leonard N. Stern School of Business (also as NYU Stern, Stern School of Business, or simply Stern) is the business school of New York University, a private research university based in New York City. Founded as the School of Commerce, Accounts and Finance in 1900, the school received its current name in 1988.

Stern is a founding member of the Association to Advance Collegiate Schools of Business. Established as the School of Commerce, Accounts and Finance, the school changed its name in 1988 in honor of Leonard N. Stern, an alumnus and benefactor of the school. The school offers Bachelor of Science in Business at the undergraduate level and Master of Business Administration degrees at the postgraduate level. The schoool is located on Gould Plaza next to the Courant Institute of Mathematical Sciences and the economics department of the College of Arts and Sciences. Consistently ranked among the best business schools, Stern was ranked 1st among US schools for careers in finance on Wall Street in 2018, accounting for 3.9% of hires among major investment banks. The school was also ranked 1st in the world for finance for all years between 2017–2021 based on the Academic Ranking of World Universities (ARWU).

Stern's alumni include former Chair of the Federal Reserve of the United States, Alan Greenspan; former CEO and current Chairman of Nasdaq, Robert Greifeld; Iceland's "first billionaire", Thor Bjorgolfsson; former CEO and Chairman of MetLife, John J. Creedon; former CEO of Viacom, Thomas E. Dooley; CFO of Pfizer, Alan Levin; President of DC Comics, Paul Levitz; and the founding financier of The Home Depot, Kenneth Langone. Current and former CEOs of Fortune 500 companies including American Express, Berggruen Institute, Griffon Corporation, Wynn Resorts, the New York Stock Exchange, Lehman Brothers, Lord Abbett, Barnes & Noble, W. R. Berkley Corporation, McKinsey & Company, Chase Manhattan Bank, and CBS are also Stern alumni.

History
The Stern School was founded by Charles Waldo Haskins (an alumnus of New York University Tandon School of Engineering) in 1900 as the Undergraduate School of Commerce, Accounts and Finance on the university's Washington Square campus. In 1913, Jeanette Hamill, J.D., M.A., joined the school's Economics department, becoming its first female faculty member. In 1936, women comprised 15% of the total enrollment.

Graduate School of Business Administration
The Graduate School of Business Administration was launched in 1916, and was housed in the NYU's School of Commerce's Wall Street branch. Located in New York's downtown business district, the school's "Wall Street Division" served both full-time and currently employed students.  The graduate school's first dean was appointed in 1921.

By 1945, the school's enrollment was well over 10,000 with graduates hailing from 36 countries and 48 states. In the 1960s, international business courses were introduced and soon became an important focus of the school's curriculum. The New York University, Graduate School of Business Administration, C.J. Devine Institute of Finance (1959–1966) published many key Finance and Investment bulletins related to International finance. The school awarded its first Doctor of Commercial Sciences degree in 1970.

Commerce/College of Business and Public Administration
The School of Commerce, Accounts and Finance was renamed the College of Business and Public Administration in 1972. In the same year, Tisch Hall, designed by Philip Johnson and Richard Foster in a similar style as Bobst Library and Meyer Hall, opened at 40 West Fourth Street to house the undergraduate college.

Stern's donation
In 1988, a $30 million gift from the school's alumnus Leonard N. Stern (B.S., 1957; M.B.A., 1959) allowed the school to consolidate its graduate and undergraduate facilities at NYU's Washington Square campus. The school was renamed Leonard N. Stern School of Business. In 1992, Stern's new $68 million state-of-the-art facility, now known as Kaufman Management Center, was inaugurated.

In 1998, a $10 million gift from Henry Kaufman (PhD 1958) supported a major expansion and upgrading of Stern's facilities. The new and renovated space is used almost exclusively to improve the quality of student life. Prominent investment banker and Home Depot investor Kenneth Langone (MBA 1960) donated $10 million to Stern in 1999. The Langone MBA for Working Professionals was renamed in his honor. Celebrating its 100th birthday in the year 2000, Stern launched a $100 million centennial campaign, the school's most ambitious fundraising effort to date. The campaign doubled the school's endowment, the number of named professorships, and the level of student financial aid.

Peter Blair Henry became dean of the school in January 2010.

In 2010, the  renovation of the three Stern School of Business buildings, known as the Stern Concourse Project, was completed.  This project was fully funded by donors, alumni and corporate partners.

NYU Stern Westchester offers its Langone MBA for Working Professionals in Purchase, New York, at SUNY Purchase.

Academics
As of October 2022, 2,865 students were enrolled in Stern's undergraduate program and 2,735 were enrolled in its Master of Business Administration (MBA) program. There are 455 faculty, which includes tenured, tenure-track, clinical, visiting and adjunct faculty. Stern offers a broad spectrum of academic programs at the graduate and undergraduate levels. The school is located on West 4th Street, occupying Shimkin and Tisch Halls and the Kaufman Management Center, on NYU's Washington Square campus. Stern offers academic majors in Marketing, Finance, Information Systems, Actuarial Science, Economic Policy, Economic Theory, Entertainment Media & Technology, Accounting (CPA and General) and others, as well as co-majors in International Business, Financial Systems, Sustainable Business, and a certificate program in Entertainment, Media and Technology. Stern also offers an Executive MBA program for experienced professionals and executives, a 22-month-long degree program which includes two global study tours as a part of the curriculum. The average age of executive MBA degree candidates is 27, and 45% of the students have at least one advanced degree in other areas.

Students who attend the Stern School of Business are often called "Sternies."

Stern offers its own study abroad program, IBEX (International Business Exchange Program). This program lasts one semester at many business schools around the world. Stern currently has multiple partner schools for this program in Singapore, Australia, China, Denmark, England, France, Hong Kong SAR, Italy, South Korea, Mexico, The Netherlands, Spain and Thailand.

Student life

Student investment organizations 
In 2005, Stern launched the Student Social Venture Fund, the first student-run venture philanthropy fund of its kind at a U.S. business school. In 2012, Professor James B. Rosenwald and his wife, Laura made a contribution to Stern for the Rosenwald Global Value Student Investment Fund. Every year, a tenth of the fund will be invested in one or more stocks based on recommendations made by the students in his Global Value Investing class.

Rankings

 #3 Graduate Finance Program in the U.S. by U.S. News & World Report (2023) 
 #5-equal Best Undergraduate Business Program in the U.S. by U.S. News & World Report (2023) 
 #12-equal in the U.S. by U.S. News & World Report (2023) 
 #11-equal in the U.S. by Bloomberg Businessweek (2023) 
 #6 for Compensation by Bloomberg Businessweek (2023)
 #9 in the U.S. and #13 worldwide by CEOWORLD Magazine (2023)
 #10 in the U.S. and #19 worldwide by QS Global MBA Rankings (2023) 
 #11 in the U.S. and #18 worldwide by Times Higher Education World University Rankings (2023)
 #14 in the U.S. and #19 worldwide by Financial Times (2023) 
 #1 for Finance MBA in the U.S. by The Princeton Review (2023)
 #1 Best Career Prospects in the U.S. by The Princeton Review (2023)
 #5 Best Business School in the U.S. by The Princeton Review (2023)
 #6 in the U.S. and worldwide for Post-MBA Salary by The Economist (2022)
 #7 in the U.S. by Fortune Magazine (2022) 
 #7 for Top-Tier Jobs by QS Top MBA (2021)

Undergraduate programs
Undergraduate students from Stern, either graduate with a Bachelor of Science in Business, in Business and Political Economy (BPE) or in Business, Technology and Entrepreneurship (BTE). The programs are all extremely selective. In 2021, the acceptance rate for the class of 2025 was 5.6%. In 2020, the Finance and International Business programs were both ranked #2 nationally by U.S. News & World Report. Transfer admission to Stern's undergraduate program is also highly selective, with a transfer acceptance rate of 2% in 2019.

Graduate programs
Stern offers the Master of Business Administration (MBA) for full-time students and executive programs for working professionals. It also offers Master of Science (MS) degrees; one is intended to prepare students to become Certified Public Accountants, two are collaborations with New York University Shanghai, and one is a collaboration with the Hong Kong University of Science and Technology. Stern also offers several dual degree tracks, including the MD/MBA program for those enrolled at the Grossman School of Medicine, the JD/MBA program for those enrolled at the NYU School of Law, and the MBA/MFA program for those enrolled in the Graduate Film Program at the Tisch School of the Arts.

Admissions
Admissions decisions are handled by the school's parent institution, New York University, and are made on a holistic basis that considers academic record, standardized test scores, accomplishments outside of the classroom, recommendations, essays, and diversity.

In 2021, the median combined verbal and math SAT score of incoming freshmen at the undergraduate level of Stern was 1550 and 77% ranked within the top 10% of their high school's graduating class. In 2021, the undergraduate acceptance rate dropped to 5.6%.

The MBA program's admission rate is one of the lowest in the country at 15.7%. The admitted (full-time) MBA students' average Graduate Management Admission Test (GMAT) score was 720 with an undergraduate average GPA of 3.51. The Stern School announced it will join the growing list of programs now accepting the Graduate Record Examinations (GRE) from MBA candidates applying beginning in 2010. Applicants will have the option to submit either GMAT or GRE scores with their application.

Alumni and faculty

Stern's alumni include former Chair of the Federal Reserve of the United States, Alan Greenspan; former CEO and current Chairman of Nasdaq, Robert Greifeld; Iceland's "first billionaire", Thor Bjorgolfsson; former CEO and Chairman of MetLife, John J. Creedon;  former CEO of Viacom, Thomas E. Dooley; CFO of Pfizer, Alan Levin; President of DC Comics, Paul Levitz; and the founding financier of The Home Depot, Kenneth Langone. Current and former CEOs of Fortune 500 companies including American Express, Berggruen Institute, Griffon Corporation, Wynn Resorts, the New York Stock Exchange, Lehman Brothers, Lord Abbett, Barnes & Noble, W. R. Berkley Corporation, McKinsey & Company, Chase Manhattan Bank, and CBS are also Stern alumni. Stern’s alumni also includes a Guinness World Record holder, Vanessa O'Brien, the first woman to reach Earth’s highest and lowest points.

See also
List of business schools in the United States
List of United States business school rankings
Stern Global Programs
NYU Stern Center for Business and Human Rights

References

External links

Business schools in New York (state)
Business
Educational institutions established in 1900
1900 establishments in New York City